This is a list of notable people who are from Richmond Hill, Ontario, or have spent a large part or formative part of their career in the city.

Actors
 Lisa Berry, actor
 Ramin Karimloo, actor and singer
 Drew Marshall, television personality
 Dylan Neal, actor
 Steve Patterson, comedian
 Italia Ricci, actor
 Cristine Rotenberg, actor and YouTube personality
 Mag Ruffman, actor
 R.H. Thomson, actor
 Jonathon Young, actor

Athletes

 Mobolade Ajomale, Olympic sprinter
 Bill Armstrong, ice hockey player
 Charles Assmann, football player
 Lee Bentham, racing driver
 Jordan Binnington, ice hockey player, 2019 Stanley Cup Champion
 Josh Binstock, Olympic beach volleyball player
 Luciano Borsato, ice hockey player
 Cassie Campbell, former ice hockey player, current broadcaster
 Michael Cammalleri, ice hockey player
 Daniel Catenacci, ice hockey player
 Rick Cornacchia, general manager of the National Training Rinks in Richmond Hill
 Jonathan D'Aversa, ice hockey player
 Michael Dal Colle, ice hockey player
 David Davidson, baseball player
 Stefan Della Rovere, ice hockey player
 Anthony Di Biase, soccer player
 Curtis Joseph, ice hockey player
 Mara Jones, rower
 Derek Joslin, ice hockey player
 Scott Kosmachuk, ice hockey player
 Christine Peng-Peng Lee, artistic gymnast
 David Levin, Israeli ice hockey player
 Ryan Lomberg, ice hockey player
 Connor McDavid, ice hockey player
 John McFarland, ice hockey player
 Julian Melchiori, ice hockey player
 Alexandra Najarro, former figure skater
 Frank Nigro, ice hockey player
 Jeff O'Neill, ice hockey player
 Emeka Ononye, soccer player
 Pete Orr, baseball player
 Matthew Palleschi, soccer player
 Theo Peckham, ice hockey player
 Taylor Pendrith, PGA golfer
 Merlyn Phillips, ice hockey player
 Keith Redmond, former ice hockey player
 Austin Ricci, soccer player
 Andrei Rogozine, figure skater
 Rob Rusnov, Olympic archer
 Emmanuel Sandhu, figure skater
 Sam Schachter, Olympic beach volleyball player
 Elvis Stojko, World Champion figure skater
 Trish Stratus, retired WWE wrestler
 Bob Wall, ice hockey player
 Jason Wilson, ice hockey player
 Carol Zhao, tennis player

Entrepreneurs
 Isai and Mark Scheinberg, co-founders of PokerStars

Musicians
 The Flatliners, music band
 Kim Richardson, singer
 Steve Sexton, composer
 Wendy Son, singer in Korean pop girl group Red Velvet

Politicians
 Leona Alleslev, former Member of Parliament
Dave Barrow, Mayor of Richmond Hill
 William F. Bell, former Mayor of Richmond Hill
 Isaac Crosby, politician
 William Harrison, politician
 James Langstaff, politician
 Abraham Law, politician
 Don Meredith, politician
 William H. Pugsley, politician
 Peter G. Savage, politician
 Alfred Stong, politician
 William Trench III, politician
 Bryon Wilfert, politician
 Kathleen Wynne, former Premier of Ontario

Writers
 Tracy Moore, journalist
 Farley Mowat, novelist
 Craig Walker, writer

Other
 Hannah Alper, teen activist and blogger
 Grace Marks, convicted 19th century murderer
 Susannah Maxwell, one of the city's first Black residents and Canada's oldest citizen at the time of her death in 1923
 Poorya Nazari, poker player
 Henri Nouwen, worked in L'Arche community in Richmond Hill
 Matthew Teefy, historical figure
 Mariana Valente, beauty pageant title holder

See also
 List of people from Ontario

References

 
Richmond Hill
Richmond Hill